Chris Widener (born 18 April 1966) is an American author and motivational speaker.   Widener has written several books on motivation and business and is a member of the Motivational Speakers Hall of Fame.

Widener first entered the public speaking industry in 1988. Widener started American Community Business Network, a publishing company later known as Made for Success, in the early 1990s.

He co-authored the 2005 book Twelve Pillars with motivational speaker Jim Rohn. In 2009, Widener sold Made for Success to his business partner.  Widener hosted several programs for The Success Training Network, which was a web television site for marketing and motivational content.

Widener ran a campaign as a Republican for Senate in 2010 in Washington State, which was halted before the primaries.

Bibliography
 Twelve Pillars (Jim Rohn International, 2005) with Jim Rohn 
 The Image (Chris Widener International, 2006) 
 Live the Life You Have Always Dreamed Of (Chris Widener International, 2006) 
 The Angel Inside (Crown Business, 2007) 
 The Art of Influence (Crown Business, 2008) 
 Above All Else (Success Books, 2009) 
 The Leadership Rules (Jossey-Bass, 2010)

References

External links

Living people
Writers from Seattle
1966 births
American motivational speakers